is a 1966 Japanese television series. It is the 4th NHK taiga drama.

Story
Taikōki deals with the Kamakura period. Based on Genzō Murakami's novels "Minamoto no Yoshitsune".

The story chronicles the life of Minamoto no Yoshitsune.

Production
 Kunishirō Hayashi - Sword fight arranger

Cast

Yoshitsune and people around him
 Onoe Kikunosuke VII as Minamoto no Yoshitsune
 Ken Ogata as Benkei
 Junko Fuji as Shizuka Gozen
 Isuzu Yamada as Tokiwa Gozen
 Hiroshi Akutagawa as Minamoto no Yoritomo
 Michiko Otsuka as Hojo Masako
 Kazuo Kitamura as Ōe no Hiromoto
 Jun Tazaki as Tosano bo Soshun
 Shin Kishida as Onuki Jiro
 Isao Hashizume

Taira clan
 Ryutaro Tashumi as Taira no Kiyomori
 Chiyonosuke Azuma as Taira no Munemori
 Kazuo Funaki as Taira no Atsumori
 Takashi Yamaguchi as Taira no Noritsune
 Shōbun Inoue as Taira no Moritsugu
 Takeshi Katō as Taira no Kagekiyo
 Chikao Ohtsuka as Fujiwara no Tadakiyo

Fujiwara clan
 Osamu Takizawa as Fujiwara no Hidehira
 Mayumi Ogawa as Shinobu
 Masakazu Tamura as Fujiwara no Tadahira
 Masao Shimizu as Fujiwara no Motonari
 Daisuke Katō as Kaneuri Kichiji
 Misako Watanabe as Akane

Others
 Bandō Mitsugorō IX as Takashina no Yasutsune
 Fumio Watanabe as Inoie Hachiro
 Machiko Washio as Ku
 Kenji Utsumi as Toraus
 Jūkei Fujioka as Adachi Saburō Kiyotsune
 Ryūtarō Ōtomo as Togashi Yasuie
 Shūichirō Moriyama as Aiko Sanjuro

References

External links

1960s drama television series
1966 Japanese television series debuts
1966 Japanese television series endings
Cultural depictions of Minamoto no Yoshitsune
Jidaigeki television series
Taiga drama
Television series set in the 12th century
Cultural depictions of Hōjō Masako